Microsveltia procerula is a species of sea snail, a marine gastropod mollusk in the family Cancellariidae, the nutmeg snails.

Description
The length of the shell attains 4.4 mm.

Distribution
This marine species occurs off Tanimbar Island, Indonesia.

References

 Verhecken, A. (1997). Mollusca, Gastropoda: Arafura Sea Cancellariidae collected during the KARUBAR Cruise. in: Crosnier, A. et al. (Ed.) Résultats des Campagnes MUSORSTOM 16. Campagne Franco-Indonésienne KARUBAR. Mémoires du Muséum national d'Histoire naturelle. Série A, Zoologie. 172: 295–324. 
 Hemmen, J. (2007). Recent Cancellariidae. Annotated and illustrated catalogue of Recent Cancellariidae. Privately published, Wiesbaden. 428 pp

Cancellariidae
Gastropods described in 1997